Proteuxoa bistrigula is a moth of the family Noctuidae. It is found in the Australian Capital Territory, New South Wales, Victoria, Tasmania and South Australia.

External links
Range

Proteuxoa
Moths of Australia
Moths described in 1857